Thomas Foley, 2nd Baron Foley may refer to:

Thomas Foley, 2nd Baron Foley (1703–1766), second baron of the first creation
Thomas Foley, 2nd Baron Foley (1742–1793), second baron of the second creation

See also
Thomas Foley (disambiguation)